Chabab Riadhi Baladiyat Aïn Fakroun, known as CRB Aïn Fakroun or simply CRBAF for short, is an Algerian football club located in Aïn Fakroun in Oum El Bouaghi Province. The club was founded in 1947 and its team colours are  black and white. Their home stadium, Stade Abderrahmane Allag, has a capacity of 9,000 spectators. The club is currently playing in the Ligue Nationale du Football Amateur.

History
In 2011, CRB Aïn Fakroun beat ESC Tadjenanet 1–0 in the regional tour of the Algerian Cup. However, they failed to qualify for the round of 32 after losing out on penalties to JS Djijel.

In the 2012–13 season, CRB Aïn Fakroun finished first in the 2012–13 Algerian Ligue Professionnelle 2 to gain promotion to the Algerian Ligue Professionnelle 1 for the first time in its history.

Honours
 Algerian Ligue Professionnelle 2: 1
 2012/13

Managers
 Lamine Boughrara (July 1, 2013 – Sept 5, 2013)
 Saïd Hammouche (Sept 10, 2013 – Nov 24, 2013)
 Abdelaziz Abbès (Nov 27, 2013–)

Rival Clubs
  US Chaouia (Derby)
  JSM Skikda (Rivalry)
  ES Collo (Rivalry)
  MO Béjaïa (Rivalry)

References

 
Football clubs in Algeria
Association football clubs established in 1947
1947 establishments in Algeria
Sports clubs in Algeria